Sheila on 7 is the first album by Sheila on 7. It was released in 1999.

Track listing

All-time charts

Sheila on 7 albums
1999 debut albums